William Allan Van Evera (11 August 1934 – 8 January 2003), known by the stage name Billy Van, was a Canadian comedian, actor, and singer.

Biography
Van was born in Toronto, Ontario, and dropped out of Bloor Collegiate Institute in Grade 11 to pursue a career as an entertainer. Starting as a youth, he and his four brothers toured North America as a singing act called the Van Evera Brothers. After leaving his brothers and dropping "Evera" from his name, Van performed as a singer, leading the Billy Van Four and later the Billy Van Singers, and making frequent appearances on Canadian variety television shows such as Fancy Free. The single "I Miss You" / "The Last Sunrise" by the Billy Van Four, released on the Rodeo International label, peaked at number 29 on the CHUM Chart in Toronto in March 1961.

As a comedian, Van gained national attention in 1963 as a performer on CBC Television's late-night satire programme Nightcap. He threatened to quit the show after three seasons when the CBC wouldn't give him a requested raise from $400 to $500 an episode. At that time, a columnist in The Globe and Mail called Van "perhaps the most talented variety performer ever developed by the CBC." After the dispute became public, the CBC capitulated and Van continued on the show for one final season. Van appeared in a six-part spinoff series, Flemingdon Park, based on a recurring Nightcap skit, that aired at the beginning of 1967. Nightcap was cancelled in May 1967.  In the United States he appeared in many commercials for Colt 45 Malt Liquor as a man sitting at a table waiting for a drink, unfazed by everything going on around him; Van starred in these commercials throughout the 60s and 70s, and won a Clio Award for one of these commercials in 1975.

Through the 1970s, Van was a regular member of the "home team" on the CHCH-TV charades series Party Game. In 1971, he began making The Hilarious House of Frightenstein, also for CHCH in Hamilton, Ontario. It is this show for which he is best known, and it has developed a cult following. 130 episodes were produced, and Van played almost every lead character. The characters included the Count (Count Frightenstein, for which he put on a fake Bela Lugosi-type voice); Grizelda the Ghastly Gourmet (an old witch with a cauldron who did a cooking show); the Wolfman, who, in an imitation of DJ Wolfman Jack would play records, and dance to them, while wearing a werewolf costume (rock songs from Sly and the Family Stone, The Archies, or other bands of the era were played in their entirety); the Librarian, an ancient bearded character who tried "to horrify you" with benign fairy tales from dusty old cobwebbed volumes, then would be disappointed when the unseen viewers were not horrified; Dr. Petvet, who would bring animals onto a set and talk about them (his catchphrase was "Pets are friends"); and the Oracle, who would give astrological readings, and answer fake letters from viewers while wearing a large headdress and speaking in a Peter Lorre voice.

Van was a regular performer on The Ray Stevens Show, The Ken Berry "Wow" Show, The Sonny & Cher Comedy Hour, The Bobby Vinton Show, and the Hudson Brothers Razzle Dazzle Show, most of which were co-produced by Chris Bearde, who had been a writer-performer on Nightcap.  In 1982, he co-hosted TVOntario's Bits and Bytes, a show devoted to the usage of early (mostly 8-bit) personal computers, a role returned to 1991 in Bits and Bytes 2. Van narrated the animated program Eureka!, which taught children about physics and chemistry. Van also appeared occasionally in the Canadian TV show Bizarre, hosted by John Byner.

He had a triple heart bypass in 1998.

Van supported the Canadian Comedy Awards with promotional appearances from the awards' inception in 2000.

He was diagnosed in December 2001 with esophageal cancer, of which he died at age 68 on 8 January 2003 at Toronto's Sunnybrook Hospital. He was survived by his wife Susan and two daughters, Tracy and Robin, from previous marriages.

One of Van's brothers, Jack Van Evera, also became an actor and appeared on many Canadian television series such as The Forest Rangers and Adventures in Rainbow Country.

Billy Van wrote his autobiography "Second Banana," in 1997, which was published online on 11 August 2018. It is an entertaining, humorous and informative journey of his career. Second Banana is also an historical look at life in Toronto in the 40's and 50's and the infancy of Canadian television; a behind-the-scenes insight from a performer's perspective and reveals the often not-so-glamorous side of being an entertainer.

In December 2020, author Greg Oliver teamed with Stacey Case and Van's two daughters, Robin Edwards Mills and Tracy Van Evera, to see the publication of the biography, Who's The Man? Billy Van!

Discography

Billy Van Four
1961: The Last Sunrise / I Miss You (Rodeo label, Canada)

Billy Van Singers
1967: Spider-Man theme song
1968: Polydor Presents The Billy Van Singers LP (Polydor)
1969: "Fall In" A Fun Fashion Musical (DuPont Canada/Chelsea Records) on 1 track

Filmography

Television series

1960: Fancy Free (with The Billy Van Four)
1960-1961: Country Hoedown
1963-1967: Nightcap
1970: The Ray Stevens Show
1970-1980: Party Game
1971: Rollin' on the River (with Kenny Rogers and The First Edition)
1971: The Hilarious House of Frightenstein
1972: The Ken Berry "Wow" Show
1972-1973: Waterville Gang (voice)
1973-1974: The Sonny & Cher Comedy Hour
1974: The Hudson Brothers Razzle Dazzle Show
1974: Shh! It's the News
1975-1976: The Bobby Vinton Show
1976: The Sonny and Cher Show
1980: Eureka! (voice)
1980: Bizarre
1981: Seeing Things (guest star)
1983: Bits and Bytes (host)
1984: The Littlest Hobo (TV Series) Episode FireHorse (part 1 & 2) (Guest Star as Fire Chief Danford)
1987: I'll Take Manhattan
1988 How Do You Do? (as robot (TVOntatrio))
1991: Bits and Bytes 2 (host)
1998: Stories From My Childhood (voice)

Television movies
1985: The Hearst and Davies Affair
1986: A Deadly Business
1992: The Trial of Red Riding Hood
1995: Net Worth

Movies
1982: The Wizard of Oz (voice)
1988: Family Reunion

References

External links
 
 

1934 births
2003 deaths
20th-century Canadian male actors
20th-century Canadian male singers
Canadian male film actors
Canadian male television actors
Comedians from Toronto
Deaths from lung cancer
Male actors from Toronto
Musicians from Toronto
Deaths from cancer in Ontario
Canadian television personalities
Canadian sketch comedians
20th-century Canadian comedians